Carex humbertii is a tussock-forming species of perennial sedge in the family Cyperaceae. It is native to central parts of Madagascar.

See also
List of Carex species

References

humbertii
Taxa named by Henri Chermezon
Plants described in 1927
Flora of Madagascar